The F116 engine family is a series of 65° DOHC V12 petrol engines produced by Ferrari since 1992. Introduced with the 456 GT, this engine had a displacement of 5.5 L and was a fresh new design who replaced the previous Colombo-derived F101 60° V12 engines used in Ferrari 412 four-seater.
A more performant variant named F133 debuted in 1996 with the 550 Maranello, replacing the F113 flat-12 engines.

The production of the F116 ceased in 2003; in the same period the F133's displacement was increased to 5.7 L and lasted until 2011. It was then replaced by the F140 engine family.

All those engines featured dry sump lubrication and 48 valves driven by dual overhead camshafts per bank. The block and cylinder heads were constructed from light alloy, featuring Nikasil treated alloy cylinder liners. A Bosch Motronic 2.7 combined fuel injection/ignition engine management system was initially fitted, superseded by a Motronic 5.2 unit in 1996 and by a Motronic ME7 system for the 5.7 L versions.

Motorsport
Some engineering companies built racing versions based on the F133A engine, without any support from the Ferrari factory. Those engines were used in various 550 GT racecars, most notably the Prodrive-developed 550 GTS who took many victories in the FIA GT Championship, the European Le Mans Series and the 24 Hours of Le Mans.

A factory 6.0 L racing version of the F133 engine was jointly developed by Ferrari and N.Technology for the 575 GTC.

Applications

Awards
The 5.5 L variant of the F116/F133 engine family was awarded "Above 4.0 litre" recognition in the 2000 and 2001 International Engine of the Year competition.

See also
List of Ferrari engines

References

Ferrari engines
Gasoline engines by model
V12 engines